At The Dream's Edge is Chimp Spanner's second album, independently released in December 2009. It was re-released by Basick Records in 2010 after Chimp Spanner signed to them. This is the first Chimp Spanner album to feature an 8 string guitar, which was used on the songs "At The Dream's Edge", "Bad Code", "Far From Home" and "Under One Sky". Coming in at almost an hour and one minute, this is Chimp Spanner's longest album to date.

Track listing

Personnel
Chimp Spanner
 Paul Ortiz - guitars, bass, keyboards, drum programming and production

References

External links
 Chimp Spanner official website
 Chimp Spanner on Soundclick
 Chimp Spanner's Album on Bandcamp

2009 albums
Chimp Spanner albums